Nguyễn Thanh Thắng (born 24 December 1988) is a Vietnamese footballer who plays as a goalkeeper for V-League (Vietnam) club Hồ Chí Minh City.

Honours
Hải Phòng
Vietnamese National Cup: 2014
Vietnamese Super Cup: Runner-up: 2015
FLC Thanh Hóa 
V.League 1: Runner-up: 2017, 2018
Vietnamese National Cup: Runner-up 2018
Hồ Chí Minh City
V.League 1: Runner-up: 2020
Vietnamese Super Cup: Runner-up: 2020

External links

References

1988 births
Living people
Vietnamese footballers
Vietnam international footballers
People from Đồng Nai Province
Association football goalkeepers
V.League 1 players
Dong Nai FC players
Dong Thap FC players
Haiphong FC players
Thanh Hóa FC players